Joshua Schmidt is an American composer, lyricist, bookwriter and theatrical sound designer.  He is known for the musicals Adding Machine, A Minister's Wife and Midwestern Gothic.

Musical theatre
 Adding Machine (2007, Jason Loewith co-bookwriter, co-lyricist)
 A Minister's Wife (2009, Jan Tranen, lyricist; Austin Pendleton, bookwriter)
 Whida Peru: Resurrection Tango (2010, David Simpatico, book and lyrics)
 Midwestern Gothic (2017, Royce Vavrek bookwriter, co-lyricist)

References

Living people
21st-century American composers
American lyricists
American sound artists
Year of birth missing (living people)